Indotyphlops meszoelyi, the Darjeeling worm snake or Meszoely's blind snake, is a species of snake in the family Typhlopidae. The species is endemic to Darjeeling, West Bengal Province, India.

Etymology
Indotyphlops meszoelyi was named after American paleontologist Charles A.M. Meszoely (born 1933) of the Center for Vertebrate Studies at Northeastern University in Boston, Massachusetts.

Description
It can be distinguished from other species in the same genus found in that region by the presence of a "deep concavity along the posterior border of the nasal shield". The snake is brown on its back and lighter brown on its belly, with the two colors merging into each other.

Habitat and ecology
The holotype specimen of I. meszoelyi was collected in a region of rugged hills, in the foothills of the Himalayas. It is thought to inhabit temperate broadleaf forests. The area in which the specimen was collected was historically montane forest, but today has been mostly turned into fruit orchards and paddy fields. I. meszoelyi is oviparous, or egg-laying.

Geographic range and conservation status
No other information about its distribution is currently available. The International Union for Conservation of Nature (IUCN) classified Typhlops meszoelyi as Data Deficient in 2010, based on the fact that the species was only known from the location in which the holotype specimen was collected. However, it stated that habitat loss and degradation were known to occur within the range of the species, although the impact of these on the snake was unknown. The area in which the specimen was found is used to graze livestock, which may constitute a threat to the species.

References

Further reading
 (Indotyphlops meszoelyi, new combination).

Indotyphlops
Endemic fauna of India
Reptiles of India
Reptiles described in 1999